The 1971–72 Liga Leumit season saw Maccabi Tel Aviv win the title, whilst Bnei Yehuda and Hapoel Hadera were both relegated. Yehuda Shaharabani of Hakoah Ramat Gan was the league's top scorer with 21 goals.

Final table

Results

References
Israel - List of final tables RSSSF

Liga Leumit seasons
Israel
1971–72 in Israeli football leagues